The  Vice Fund (MUTF: VICEX), formerly the Barrier Fund, is a mutual fund investing in companies that have significant involvement in, or derive a substantial portion of their revenues from the tobacco, gambling, defense/aerospace, and alcohol industries, i.e., business devoted to behaviors that are traditionally regarded as morally questionable vices.

The fund has received a great deal of media coverage even in non-English magazines.

History 
The fund manager as of September 1, 2020 is Paul Strehle.

The fund was organized in March 2001 by USA Mutuals, which at the time was known as Mutuals.com. The fund's inception date was August 30, 2002. On October 1, 2019, USA Mutuals renamed the Vice Fund to the Vitium Global Fund. The newly named fund will invest at least 40% of its assets in foreign companies.

References

External links
 VICE FUND Fact Sheet
 Official site

Mutual funds of the United States